Rear Admiral (Junior Grade) Laura Janse van Vuuren is a South African Navy officer and the second woman to reach flag rank.

Biography
She completed her schooling at Zwaanswyk High School in 1976 and joined the Navy in 1977. She initially entered the Navy as a non-commissioned officer and then completed the officer's course in 1979.

In 2006 she was appointed as Director Equity Strategic Direction for the SANDF and promoted to rear admiral (JG). She was then appointed commandant of the South African National Defence College at Thaba Tshwane from 1 January 2011.

Honours and awards
In 2007 she was awarded the French National Defence Medal (Gold) for outstanding service to the French Armed Forces in South Africa and abroad.

 
 
 
 
 
  National Defence Medal (Gold) France

References

South African admirals
Living people
Year of birth missing (living people)